Lampropeltis knoblochi, commonly known as the Madrean mountain kingsnake, Knobloch's mountain kingsnake , or the Chihuahuan mountain kingsnake, is a species of colubrid snake residing in western North America.

It is a coral snake mimic, having nearly the same pattern on its body, except instead on yellow, the kingsnake has white crossbands.

It lives mostly on the mountains of its relatively small Sonoran Desert region, in Sonora, Mexico.

knoblochi
Reptiles of Mexico
Fauna of the Sonoran Desert